Benskin is a surname. Notable people with the surname include:

Sammy Benskin (1922–1992), American pianist and bandleader
Tyrone Benskin (born 1958), English-Canadian actor and politician
William Benskin (1880–1956), English cricketer

See also
Benskins Brewery, English brewery